Hot Snow may refer to:

"Hot Snow" (The Avengers), pilot episode of The Avengers
 Hot Snow (film), a 1972 Soviet film